The 2004 Hastings Direct International Championships was a women's tennis tournament played on grass courts at the Eastbourne Tennis Centre in Eastbourne in the United Kingdom that was part of Tier II of the 2004 WTA Tour. It was the 30th edition of the tournament and was held from June 14 through June 19, 2004.

Finals

Singles

 Svetlana Kuznetsova defeated  Daniela Hantuchová 2–6, 7–6(7–2), 6–4
 It was Kuznetsova's 1st singles title of the year and the 3rd of her career.

Doubles

 Alicia Molik /  Magüi Serna defeated  Svetlana Kuznetsova /  Elena Likhovtseva 6–4, 6–4
 It was Molik's 1st doubles title of her career. It was Serna's only doubles title of the year and the 2nd of her career.

References

External links
 ITF Tournament Profile

Hastings Direct International Championships
Eastbourne International
2004 in English women's sport
June 2004 sports events in the United Kingdom
2004 in English tennis